Declarations of State Land in the West Bank are declarations by Israeli authorities that Palestinian land is "state land", that is, land that may be legally administered by an occupying power on a temporary basis under international law, on the theory that the occupier is holding the territory in trust until sovereignty can be restored. It was and is the principal method used by the governments of Mandatory Palestine and Israel respectively, to acquire land from Palestinians and sell it to Israeli settlers. According to B'Tselem, it was used to expropriate 16% of the West Bank.

Historical background 
There is a complex mix of still-operative, Ottoman, British, Jordanian, Israeli, Palestinian and international law at work in the West Bank. Land and villages of the West Bank did not have a cadastral survey during the Palestine Mandate. By the Six Day War of 1967, only a third of the land had been registered.

Regulatory position and procedure 
The  Custodian  Staff  Officer  of  the  Civil Administration (also Supervisor of Governmental and Abandoned Property in "Judea and Samaria")  is  the  representative  of  the  Israel Land Authority to the West Bank, whose responsibilities include the declaration of public land (“state land”). The declaration  procedure is an internal process of the Civil Administration. Usually the Custodian signs a certificate specifying the location and area of the land along with a map. The  certificate  is sent  to  the mukhtars of  affected  villages. Objections must be submitted within 45 days and if not, the declaration is considered final and the Custodian may take possession of the land.

Elon Moreh case 
A 1979 proceedings known as the "Elon Moreh" case (Dweikat et al. v. Government of Israel) the Israeli Supreme Court ended the use of military orders for the seizure of private Palestinian land for settlements and provided the impetus for Israel to establish a new legal basis for the requisition of land if it was to be used for settlement. Following this case, during the period 1979 to 1992, 908,000 dunums were declared as state land based on a "stringent interpretation" of the 1858 Ottoman Land Code.

Blue Line task force 

In 1999, the "Blue Line Task Force" was created to re-examine land not clearly designated as State land during the 1980s. The approval of this task force is a precondition for new settlement construction plans.

Declarations after 2014 

According to Peace Now, declarations had ceased after the roadmap was concluded in 2003 but that following Netanyahu's taking office in 2009, declarations totalled more than 6000 dunums as of the end of 2015. In late August 2014, in what was widely reported as a land grab, the authorities  announced the appropriation 988 acres (3,799 dunums), defining private land south of Bethlehem as state land, which Peace Now said was the largest confiscation of Palestinian land in three decades. Then, on March 10, 2016, 2,342 dunams (580 acres) south of Jericho were declared as state land.

See also
Israeli land and property laws
Survey of Palestine

References

Bibliography 

Sami Hadawi (Editor), "Palestine Partitioned, 1947–1958", Series: League of Arab States, Document Collections, No. 3 (New York: Arab Information Center, 1959)

See also:

External links 
 COGAT Custodian

West Bank
Israeli occupation of the West Bank
Israeli settlement